Consort Chen Guinü (陳歸女) (died 390), formally Empress Dowager Ande (安德太后, formally "the peaceful and virtuous empress dowager") was an imperial consort during the Chinese Jin dynasty (266–420).  She was Emperor Xiaowu's concubine.

Chen Guinü's father Chen Guang (陳廣) was initially a musician, but he later became a governmental official and reached the rank of commandery governor. She was regarded as beautiful and skilled in music, and she was selected to be a concubine (with the rank of shuyuan) for Emperor Xiaowu. She bore him his only two sons — Sima Dezong the Crown Prince and Sima Dewen the Prince of Langye. She died in 390, still during Emperor Xiaowu's reign. After her developmentally disabled son Sima Dezong became emperor in 396 (as Emperor An), she was posthumously honored as an empress dowager, and she was worshiped in the same temple as Emperor Xiaowu's grandmother Consort Zheng Achun (鄭阿春).

Media
She is portrayed by Lu Qing in the 2017 television series General and I

References

Jin dynasty (266–420) imperial consorts
390 deaths
Year of birth unknown
Jin dynasty (266–420) posthumous empresses
4th-century Chinese women